The Pegasus Toroidal Experiment is a plasma confinement experiment relevant to fusion power production, run by the Department of Engineering Physics of the University of Wisconsin–Madison. It is a spherical tokamak, a very low-aspect-ratio version of the tokamak configuration, i.e. the minor radius of the torus is comparable to the major radius.

Local Helicity Injection 
Pegasus is used to study start up of spherical tokamaks using local helicity injection.

URANIA
Pegasus is being upgraded in 2019 (eg. by removal of the central solenoid) to build the Unified Reduced Non-Inductive Assessment (URANIA) experiment. This will study plasma startup using transient coaxial helicity injection (CHI).

The max toroidal field is being increased from 0.15 T to 0.6 T, and the pulse duration from 25 to 100 ms.

References

Tokamaks
University of Wisconsin–Madison